Snake is an artwork by Australian artist Sir Sidney Nolan. Created between 1970 and 1972, it consists of 1,620 panels arranged so that the images on each panel form a larger image of a snake. It is part of the collection of the Museum of Old and New Art (MONA) in Hobart, Australia.

Nolan is believed to have created the work after "he saw a mural in a Beijing palace that moved him to create an Australian version, inspired by the desert in springtime"

David Walsh, MONA's owner, purchased the work in 2005 for AUD$2m. Walsh modified his initial design for MONA to make space for the work. Before its installation there, Snake was shown in England and Ireland.

References

Paintings by Sidney Nolan
Snakes in art